Philibert François Milliet de Faverges (1564–1624) was a Roman Catholic prelate who served as Archbishop of Turin (1618–1624),
Bishop of Saint-Jean-de-Maurienne (1591–1618), 
and Titular Bishop of Hierapolis in Isauria (1590–1591).

Biography
Philibert François Milliet de Faverges was born in 15 November 1564 in Faverges, France.
On 4 April 1590, he was appointed during the papacy of Pope Sixtus V as Titular Bishop of Hierapolis in Isauria and Coadjutor Bishop of Saint-Jean-de-Maurienne.
He succeeded to the bishopric on 6 May 1591.
On 17 December 1618, he was appointed during the papacy of Pope Paul V as Archbishop of Turin.
He served as Archbishop of Turin until his death on 17 November 1624 in Turin, Italy.

Episcopal succession
While bishop, he was the principal consecrator of:
Charles Bobba de Montferrat, Bishop of Saint-Jean-de-Maurienne (1619);
Jean-François de Sales, Titular Bishop of Chalcedon and Coadjutor Bishop of Geneva (1621);
Francesco Sperelli, Titular Bishop of Constantina and Coadjutor Bishop of San Severino (1621);
Antonio Provana, Archbishop of Durrës (1623);
and the principal co-consecrator of:
Ercole Vaccari, Archbishop of Rossano (1619);
Isidoro Pentorio, Bishop of Asti (1619);
Agostino Solaro di Moretta, Bishop of Fossano (1621); and
Sébastien Le Bouthilier, Bishop of Aire (1621).

References

External links and additional sources
 (for Chronology of Bishops) 
 (for Chronology of Bishops) 
 (for Chronology of Bishops) 
 (for Chronology of Bishops) 
 (for Chronology of Bishops) 

16th-century Italian Roman Catholic bishops
17th-century Italian Roman Catholic bishops
Bishops appointed by Pope Sixtus V
Bishops appointed by Pope Paul V
1564 births
1624 deaths